Syed Hyder Ali (4 August 1943 – 5 November 2022) was an Indian first class cricketer who played for the Railways cricket team. In his 25-year career, he became one of the most prolific bowlers in the history of the Ranji Trophy.

References

External links

 

1943 births
2022 deaths
Indian cricketers
Railways cricketers
North Zone cricketers
Central Zone cricketers
Uttar Pradesh cricketers
Bengal cricketers
Cricketers from Allahabad